"Another Way to Die" is a song by American heavy metal band Disturbed, released as the first single from their fifth studio album, Asylum. Airplay for the single began on the morning of June 14, 2010. That same day, a lyric video was posted by the band on their official YouTube channel and was released as a digital download on June 15, 2010, via iTunes. On August 31, 2010, an excerpt of the song played in a newly released second trailer for the 2011 Mortal Kombat game.

Lyrical content
In an interview with The Pulse of Radio, frontman David Draiman explained how the track contains some very timely subject matter:

Track listing
Digital single
"Another Way to Die" – 4:13

CD single
"Another Way to Die" – 4:13
"Living After Midnight" (Judas Priest cover) – 4:25

The B-side "Living After Midnight" (originally by Judas Priest) is also included on the band's B-side compilation, The Lost Children, along with their cover of "Midlife Crisis" by Faith No More, which was originally recorded for the tribute album Covered, A Revolution in Sound.

Music video
The band shot a music video for the track directed by Robert Schober (also known as Roboshobo) and was released on August 9. It is the first music video since "Land of Confusion" to not feature any of the band members; the video focuses on worldwide events relating with the song, such as pollution and poverty.

Chart performance
In the week ending September 25, 2010, "Another Way to Die" peaked on the U.S. Billboard Rock Songs chart at number one, becoming Disturbed's first single to reach the top spot on the chart.

Weekly charts

Year-end charts

Release history

Personnel 
 David Draiman – lead vocals 
 Dan Donegan – guitar, electronics
 John Moyer – bass guitar, backing vocals
 Mike Wengren – drums, percussion

References

2010 songs
2010 singles
Disturbed (band) songs
Environmental songs
Songs written by Dan Donegan
Songs written by David Draiman
Songs written by Mike Wengren
Reprise Records singles